Potter Branch is a stream in Reynolds County in the U.S. state of Missouri. It is a tributary of Webb Creek.

Potter Branch has the name of the local Potter family.

See also
List of rivers of Missouri

References

Rivers of Reynolds County, Missouri
Rivers of Missouri